Tiago Ramos Cerveira (born 7 July 1992) is a Portuguese footballer who plays for Varzim as a left-sided full-back or winger.

Football career
Born in Coimbra, Cerveira spent most of his youth career with hometown club Académica de Coimbra, with four years at Sporting CP in between. He began his senior career in the third tier with Sertanense F.C. in 2011–12, and in July 2012 he signed a two-year deal with Associação Naval 1º de Maio of the Segunda Liga. On 23 January 2013, he made his professional debut against S.L. Benfica B and played 75 minutes.

For 2013–14, after Naval were relegated for administrative reasons, Cerveira joined Atlético C.P. who met the same fate. He then returned to the third tier, playing regularly in one-season spells at C.D. Cinfães, Lusitano FCV, F.C. Tirsense, S.C. Salgueiros, U.D. Vilafranquense and U.D. Leiria. With the last of these, he lost on penalties to former club Vilafranquense in the 2019 playoffs.

Cerveira returned to the professional game in June 2019, signing a two-year deal with Varzim S.C. of the second tier. In his second match on 18 August, he scored his first goal at the level, to equalise in a 1–1 draw at FC Porto B. On 1 September, both he and teammate Alan Henrique were given straight red cards in added time at the end of a 3–1 loss at G.D. Estoril-Praia.

References

External links

1992 births
Living people
Sportspeople from Coimbra
Portuguese footballers
Association football forwards
Liga Portugal 2 players
Segunda Divisão players
Sertanense F.C. players
Associação Naval 1º de Maio players
Atlético Clube de Portugal players
C.D. Cinfães players
Lusitano FCV players
F.C. Tirsense players
S.C. Salgueiros players
U.D. Vilafranquense players
U.D. Leiria players
Varzim S.C. players